Mogaung Monastery is a Buddhist monastery in Mandalay, Myanmar (Burma). The wooden monastery was built by the Mogaung Mibaya, a minor queen of King Pagan Min in 1847. The monastery's wooden carvings are adorned with motifs from the Ramayana.

See also
Kyaung

References

Monasteries in Myanmar
Buddhist temples in Mandalay
19th-century Buddhist temples
Religious buildings and structures completed in 1847
1847 establishments in Burma